Roberta Lynn Bondar  (born December 4, 1945) is a Canadian astronaut, neurologist and consultant. She is Canada's first female astronaut and the first neurologist in space. 

After more than a decade as head of an international space medicine research team collaborating with NASA, Bondar became a consultant and speaker in the business, scientific, and medical communities.

Roberta Bondar has received many honours including appointment as a Companion of the Order of Canada and the Order of Ontario, the NASA Space Flight Medal, over 28 honorary degrees, induction into the Canadian Medical Hall of Fame, the International Women's Forum Hall of Fame and a star on Canada's Walk of Fame.

Early life and education 
Bondar was born in Sault Ste. Marie, Ontario, on December 4, 1945. Her father, who worked for the Sault Ste. Marie Public Utilities Commission, is of Ukrainian descent, and her mother, an educator, is of English descent.

Bondar's love of the sciences began as a child. Her father built a lab in the basement where she frequently conducted experiments. Bondar dreamed of becoming an astronaut.

Because of her determination to prove her capability as a woman, Bondar received an extensive education. Bondar graduated from Sir James Dunn High School in Sault Ste. Marie, Ontario. She holds a Bachelor of Science in zoology and agriculture from the University of Guelph (1968), a Master of Science in experimental pathology from the University of Western Ontario (1971), a Doctor of Philosophy in neuroscience from the University of Toronto (1974), and a Doctor of Medicine from McMaster University (1977). Part of Bondar's undergraduate research experience includes working with the Canadian Department of Fisheries and Forestry.

Career 
As one of the first six members of the Canadian Astronaut Corps selected in 1983, Bondar began astronaut training in 1984, and in 1992 she was designated Payload Specialist for the first International Microgravity Laboratory Mission (IML-1). Bondar flew on the NASA Space Shuttle Discovery during Mission STS-42, January 22–30, 1992, during which she performed over 40 experiments in the Spacelab. Her work studying the effects of low-gravity situations on the human body allowed NASA to prepare astronauts for long stays in the space station.

After her astronaut career, Bondar led an international team of researchers at NASA for more than a decade, examining data obtained from astronauts on space missions to better understand the mechanisms underlying the body's ability to recover from exposure to space. Bondar's research in space recovery considered the linkage to Parkinson's disease in addition to other neurological effects.

Bondar pursued her interests in photography with an emphasis on natural environments; she was an Honors student in Professional Nature Photography at the Brooks Institute of Photography, Santa Barbara, California. She is the author of four photo essay books that feature her photography of the Earth. These published books include Landscape of Dreams, Passionate Vision: Discovering Canada's National Parks, The Arid Edge of Earth, and Touching the Earth. Bondar was also a certified sky diver, underwater diver and private pilot.

Bondar has also been a consultant and speaker to diverse organizations, drawing on her expertise as an astronaut, physician, scientific researcher, photographer, author, environment interpreter, and team leader. Not only can interviews from radio and TV be found of Bondar, but she also played a role in the movie Destiny in Space. Furthermore, Bondar's expertise was consulted in programs that captured both the literal and figurative takeoff of groundbreaking science—that is, the space shuttle.

In 2009, Bondar registered The Roberta Bondar Foundation as a not-for-profit charity. The foundation focuses on environmental awareness.

Honours, awards, and tributes 
Bondar is the recipient of multiple honours and awards from organizations and universities across Canada. These honours include the Vanier Award in 1985 and the F.W. (Casey) Baldwin Award in 1985.

Bondar was the first astronaut to receive a star on Canada's Walk of Fame. It was inducted on October 1, 2011, at the Elgin Theatre in Toronto.

The Roberta Bondar Park and Tent Pavilion is located in Bondar's home town (Sault Ste. Marie) in honour of the first female astronaut. Bondar also has multiple public schools named after her.

Bondar served two terms as the Chancellor of Trent University, from 2003 to 2009.

In 2009, Concordia University awarded Bondar the prestigious Loyola Medal.

In 2017, the Royal Canadian Mint released a limited edition 25th anniversary $25 coin entitled "A View of Canada from Space". The unveiling of this honour was done in her hometown of Sault Ste. Marie at Sault College on November 1, 2016.

In 2018, Thebacha and Wood Buffalo Astronomical Society renamed its observatory to The Dr. Roberta Bondar Northern Observatory.

Organizations

References

Further reading 

Joyal, Serge, and A. Kim Campbell. "A Personal Reflection on Gender Equality in Canada." Reflecting on Our Past and Embracing Our Future: A Senate Initiative for Canada, edited by Serge Joyal and Judith Seidman, McGill-Queen's University Press, Montreal; Kingston; London; Chicago, 2018, pp. 261–272. JSTOR, www.jstor.org/stable/j.ctvcj2m2z.24. Accessed February 25, 2020
Hampson, Sarah. "In the Ever-Changing Orbit of the Passionate Earthling." The Globe and Mail, April 30, 2018, www.theglobeandmail.com/technology/science/final-shuttle-launch/in-the-ever-changing-orbit-of-the-passionate-earthling/article585608/
"4 Space Veterans and 3 Novices Make Trip." The New York Times, The New York Times, January 23, 1992, www.nytimes.com/1992/01/23/us/4-space-veterans-and-3-novices-make-trip.html?searchResultPosition=1.

External links 
 CSA biography
 Bondar's home page
 Video: Roberta Bondar on patriotism following the Olympics & her favourite technology (from NAIT's techlife magazine)
Coin Honours Bondar
The Roberta Bondar Foundation

1945 births
Canadian astronauts
Canadian medical researchers
Canadian photographers
Canadian people of English descent
Canadian people of Ukrainian descent
Chancellors of Trent University
Women astronauts
Living people
Members of the Order of Ontario
McMaster University alumni
Companions of the Order of Canada
People from Sault Ste. Marie, Ontario
Physician astronauts
University of Guelph alumni
University of Toronto alumni
University of Western Ontario alumni
Canadian women physicians
Canadian neurologists
Women neurologists
Canadian women biologists
20th-century Canadian women scientists
21st-century Canadian women scientists
20th-century Canadian physicians
21st-century Canadian physicians
Scientists from Ontario
20th-century women physicians
20th-century Canadian biologists
21st-century Canadian biologists
21st-century women physicians
Space Shuttle program astronauts